Nick Blakey (born 27 February 2000) is a professional Australian rules footballer who plays for the Sydney Swans in the Australian Football League (AFL).

Early life
Blakey was born in Melbourne to father John Blakey (Fitzroy and North Melbourne dual AFL Premiership midfielder).

He moved to Brisbane with his family at two years of age before settling in Sydney as a six-year-old. 

Blakey participated in the Auskick program at East Sydney Bulldogs. and began playing junior football with the club in 2011 at the age of 11 at under 11 level, scoring 19 goals in his first season. In 2012 Nick was moved up into division 1 for under 13s where he kicked 20 more goals. Throughout the 2013 season Nick continued to play in division 1 in under 13s however only scored 6 goals for the whole season. Also during 2013 Nick played Under 14s for East Sydney Bulldogs, he was still playing in division 1 at this time and scored 16 goals. In 2014 Nick started under 15s while still continuing to play under 14s, he played both in division 1, scoring 5 goals in under 14s and 27 goals in under 15s. In Nick's final year of junior football, he played under 17s in 2015 at the age of 15. He scored 18 goals.

Blakey had a choice of three possible clubs, North Melbourne and Brisbane Lions through the father-son rule, and the Sydney Swans as a member of the Swans' Development Academy. In early 2018 Blakey revealed his preference was to play for the Sydney Swans.

AFL Career

Statistics
Updated to the end of the 2022 season.

|-
| 2019 ||  || 22
| 21 || 19 || 14 || 153 || 68 || 221 || 50 || 48 || 0.9 || 0.7 || 7.3 || 3.2 || 10.5 || 2.4 || 2.3
|-
| 2020 ||  || 22
| 16 || 8 || 13 || 126 || 36 || 162 || 36 || 36 || 0.5 || 0.8 || 7.9 || 2.3 || 10.1 || 2.3 || 2.3
|-
| 2021 ||  || 22
| 17 || 3 || 6 || 138 || 75 || 213 || 65 || 28 || 0.2 || 0.4 || 8.1 || 4.4 || 12.5 || 3.8 || 1.6
|-
| 2022 ||  || 22
| 24 || 2 || 3 || 350 || 118 || 468 || 104 || 50 || 0.1 || 0.1 || 14.6 || 4.9 || 19.5 || 4.3 || 2.1
|- class=sortbottom
! colspan=3 | Career
! 78 !! 32 !! 36 !! 767 !! 297 !! 1064 !! 255 !! 162 !! 0.4 !! 0.5 !! 9.8 !! 3.8 !! 13.6 !! 3.3 !! 2.1
|}

Notes

Honours and achievements
Individual
 AFL Rising Star nominee: 2019 (round 14)

References

External links

Living people
2000 births
Sydney Swans players
Australian rules footballers from Sydney